Barry Alexander Brown (born 28 November 1950 in Warrington, Cheshire) is an English born-American film director and editor. As a film editor, he is best known for collaborations with film director Spike Lee, editing some of Lee's best known films including Do the Right Thing (1989), Malcolm X (1992), He Got Game (1998), 25th Hour (2002), Inside Man (2006), and BlacKkKlansman (2018), the latter of which earned him a nomination for the Academy Award for Best Film Editing at the 91st Academy Awards.

As a film director, Brown co-directed the documentary film The War at Home (1979), for which it was nominated for an Academy Award for Best Documentary Feature and was one of the youngest nominees for the category. Some of his other film directing credits include The Who's Tommy, the Amazing Journey (1993), a documentary film about The Who's Tommy album, and the feature films Winning Girls Through Psychic Mind Control (2002), starring Bronson Pinchot and Son of the South (2020). Brown has also edited music videos for Michael Jackson, Prince, Stevie Wonder, Public Enemy and Arrested Development.

He is a former associate professor of Film Studies at Columbia University.

References

External links

1960 births
Living people
American film directors
American film editors
Columbia University faculty
English emigrants to the United States
People from Warrington